Ah ha may refer to: 

 "Ah ha", a track on the music album Gangstress by American rapper Khia
 A-ha, a Norwegian new wave/synthpop/pop rock/alternative rock band